The Gira de Golf Profesional Mexicana (GGPM, English: Professional Golf Tour of Mexico) is a professional golf tour for men based in Mexico. The tour was formed in 2017. GGPM events are 54-hole tournaments with 36 hole cuts. The tour also conducts an annual qualifying school and a no-cut championship tournament. The GGPM provided opportunities in 2020 for PGA Tour Latinoamérica players when the COVID-19 pandemic shut down the tour.

In December 2022, the Official World Golf Ranking announced that the GGPM would receive world ranking points from the start of 2023.

2022–23 season

Schedule
The following table lists official events during the 2022–23 season.

2021–22 season

Schedule
The following table lists official events during the 2021–22 season.

Order of Merit
The Order of Merit was based on prize money won during the season, calculated using a points-based system.

2019–20 season

Schedule
The following table lists official events during the 2019–20 season.

Order of Merit
The Order of Merit was based on prize money won during the season, calculated using a points-based system.

2018–19 season

Schedule
The following table lists official events during the 2018–19 season.

Order of Merit
The Order of Merit was based on prize money won during the season, calculated using a points-based system.

2017–18 season

Schedule
The following table lists official events during the 2017–18 season.

Order of Merit
The Order of Merit was based on prize money won during the season, calculated using a points-based system.

Order of Merit winners

Notes

References

External links

Golf in Mexico
Professional golf tours
2017 establishments in Mexico